Edward, Prince of Wales may refer to:

Edward II of England, Prince of Wales 1301–1307
Edward, the Black Prince, Prince of Wales 1343–1376
Edward of Westminster, Prince of Wales 1453–1471
Edward V of England, Prince of Wales 1471–1483
Edward of Middleham, Prince of Wales 1483–1484
Edward VI of England, Prince of Wales 1537–1547
Edward VII, Prince of Wales 1841–1901
Edward VIII, Prince of Wales 1910–1936

All but Edward II were also Duke of Cornwall. Both Edward VII and Edward VIII were also Duke of Rothesay.